The Baku 2011–12 season was Baku's fourteenth Azerbaijan Premier League season, in which they finished in 6th position. They also took part in the 2011–12 Azerbaijan Cup, which they won beating Neftchi Baku in the final and therefore qualified for the First qualifying round of the 2012–13 UEFA Europa League. It was their first full season under the management of Aleksandrs Starkovs.

Squad

Transfers

Summer

In:

Out:

Winter

In:

 

Out:

Competitions

Azerbaijan Premier League

Results summary

Results by round

Results

Notes
Match Abandoned in the 94th minute, at 0–0. Match awarded 0–3

Table

Azerbaijan Premier League Championship Group

Results summary

Results by round

Results

Table

Azerbaijan Cup

Final

Squad statistics

Appearances and goals

|-
|colspan="14"|Players who appeared for Baku no longer at the club:

|}

Goal scorers

Disciplinary record

Monthly awards

Annual awards

References

External links 
FK Baku at Soccerway.com

Fk Baku
FC Baku seasons